Grzegorz Kowal is a Polish diplomat, who since 2020 is serving as the Polish ambassador to New Zealand.

Education
Grzegorz Kowal earned his master's degree in international relations at the University of Warsaw. In 2009, he graduated from the National School of Public Administration and political science doctoral programme at the University of Warsaw (2009).

Career
After graduating, he joined the Ministry of Foreign Affairs, specializing in relations with countries of the Asia-Pacific region. Following his work as a head of division, in 2011, he was sent to the Embassy in Seoul, South Korea, where he was the 1st Secretary for political cooperation. He was temporarily in charge of consular affairs as well. In 2015 he returned to Warsaw, serving as a specialist at the MFA Bureau of Control and Audit. In 2019, he became the director of the Asia-Pacific Department.

In August 2020, Kowal was nominated as Ambassador to New Zealand, additionally accredited to Kiribati, Samoa, Tonga, and Tuvalu. On 5 November 2020, he presented his credentials to the Governor-General of New Zealand Patsy Reddy.

References 

 

20th-century births
Ambassadors of Poland to New Zealand
Living people
National School of Public Administration (Poland) alumni
University of Warsaw alumni
Year of birth missing (living people)